Stagonospora meliloti is a plant pathogen infecting alfalfa.

References

External links 
 USDA ARS Fungal Database

Fungal plant pathogens and diseases
Pleosporales
Fungi described in 1919